Games Day is a yearly run gaming convention sponsored by Games Workshop. It was started in 1975, after another games convention scheduled for August that year cancelled.  Games Workshop decided to fill the resulting gap by running a gaming day of their own. As a result, after some delays, the first Games Day was held at Seymour Hall, London on 20 December 1975. The convention was important because there were few outlets for gamers to meet each other and play, and Games Workshop used this in their efforts to build the gaming scene in the U.K.

Following this successful start, and encouraged by mainstream media coverage, the second Games Day was held at a different venue, Chelsea Town Hall, London, on 12 February 1977. The event was somewhat delayed, owing to the logistics of running a rapidly expanding business. It followed rapidly by a separate "D&D Day" at Fulham Town Hall on 12 March, this being their core funding stream at that time.

Today the Games Day convention is held regularly in the United Kingdom at the National Exhibition Centre, Birmingham. It draws enthusiasts of Games Workshop's three main games (Warhammer 40,000, Warhammer, Lord of the Rings). Not just a commercial venture, gamers go to play their games and attend presentations by special guests from the Games Workshop's head office in Nottingham.

Alongside the gaming is a dealer's area which commonly includes products from Citadel Miniatures, particularly, armies for all the game systems scheduled for release. Another attraction is the Golden Demon, a painting competition of miniatures. There is also a competition of varying degrees of seriousness, the Scrap Demon competition, in which competitors create a models from plastic sprues.

Game Day conventions outside the United Kingdom
Within the US, Games Days were held in Los Angeles, California; Baltimore, Maryland; Chicago, Illinois; and Atlanta, Georgia. In Canada, the venue was the Queen Elizabeth Building at Exhibition Place in Toronto, Ontario. In France the venue was Le Stade De France, Paris.
In the Netherlands 2 Games days were organised under the Name "Mega Gaming Day", the first on 21st November 1998 in Amersfoort at De Flint theatre and the 2nd on 13th November 1999 in Utrecht at de Jaarbeurs.

Timeline (partial; to 1978)

References

External links 
Games Workshop

Gaming conventions
Games Workshop
1975 establishments in the United Kingdom
Recurring events established in 1975
Annual events in the United Kingdom